Louis Marie de Bourbon, Duke of Rambouillet (2 January 1746 – 13 November 1749) was a French nobleman who died before his fourth birthday. He was never in the line of succession to the France's throne because he belonged to the illegitimate Bourbon-Penthièvre branch of the royal dynasty through the liaison of Louis XIV with a mistress. He was known as the Duc de Rambouillet.

Biography
He was the first born son of Louis de Bourbon, Duc de Penthièvre and his wife, Princess Maria Teresa d'Este. His paternal grandfather, Louis-Alexandre de Bourbon, comte de Toulouse, was one of the many children that Madame de Montespan presented to the Sun King during the latter's marriage to the Queen. He was born at Versailles in the suite once occupied by Mme de Montespan, and later by the Penthièvres from 1744 till 1752. Louis was accorded the title Duke of Rambouillet from birth, a dukedom conferred upon his grandfather Toulouse in 1711.

As a member of a legitimised branch of the royal House of Bourbon, he ranked below the true princes du sang but above the princes éetrangers and the ducal peers. Louis' father the Duc de Pentièvre was the greatest landowner in France and had one of the largest fortunes in Europe, having added to his own inheritance the fortune of his paternal uncle Louis-Auguste de Bourbon, duc du Maine. 

Louis Marie died at the Versailles at the age of 3. Buried at the chapel at the Château de Rambouillet, he was later moved by his posthumous sister, Louise Marie Adélaïde de Bourbon (wife of the future Philippe Égalité), to the Chapelle royale de Dreux.

Ancestry

References and notes

1746 births
1749 deaths
People from Versailles
Burials at the Chapelle royale de Dreux
Louis Marie
Dukes of Rambouillet
Royalty and nobility who died as children